"Shiver" is a song recorded by Canadian recording artist Shawn Desman for his third studio album, Fresh (2010). It was released to digital retailers through the UOMO label on February 23, 2010 as the lead single from Fresh, and reached a peak position of number 18 on the Canadian Hot 100 for the week of May 15, 2010. "Shiver" is Desman's first single to be released in five years, since "Man in Me" in 2005.

To further promote the single, other versions of the single were released digitally: "Shiver (Dance Remix)" was released on May 18, 2010, "Shiver (UOMO Remix)" was released on May 25, 2010, and an EP containing two French adaptations of "Shiver", entitled "Shiver (French Mixes)", was released on June 1, 2010.

Music video
The music video for "Shiver" was directed by RT! and shows Desman singing to his love interest while a group of black-clad male and female dancers perform an interpretive dance around him. It premiered on Vevo and iTunes on April 23, 2010. The video was covered by Dom Taino, who also covered "Oh Sherrie" by Steve Perry.

Charts

Certifications and sales

References

2010 songs
2010 singles
Shawn Desman songs
Sony BMG singles
Songs written by Thomas G:son
Songs written by Negin Djafari